In combustion, Clarke–Riley diffusion flame is a diffusion flame that develops inside a naturally convected boundary layer on a hot fuel surface with quiescent oxidizer environment, first studied and experimentally verified by John Frederick Clarke and Norman Riley in 1976. This problem is an extension of Emmons problem.

See also
Emmons problem
Liñán's diffusion flame theory

References

Fluid dynamics
Combustion